Voyager In Expanse is a compilation album by Friedemann. It takes songs from two of his previous albums. Tracks 1-4, 9, 12, 14 are from Voyager and tracks 5-8, 10, 11, 13 are from The Beginning Of Hope.

Track listing

Musicians
Information for Musicians taken from Liner Notes

Track 1: "Voyager Without Passport"
Friedemann: Electric guitar, vocals
Capo Mayer: Bass
Reinhold Hirth: Drums
Johannes Wohlleben: Synthesizer

Track 2: "Take Off"
Friedemann: Acoustic guitar

Track 3: "Air Borne"
Friedemann: Electric & acoustic guitar
Bubi Siebert: Sopran Sax
Jo Koinzer: Percussion
Capo Mayer: Bass
Reinhold Hirth: Drums

Track 4: "Dämon All-Ein"
Friedemann: Vocals and synthesizer
Anne Haigis: Vocals
Jo Koinzer: Percussion
Johannes Wohlleben: Percussion
Capo Mayer: Bass
Reinhold Hirth: Drums
Turo: Synthesizer

Track 5: "Ich Kann Nicht Bleiben"
Friedemann: Vocals, Electric & acoustic guitar
Martin Kolbe: Acoustic guitar
Ralph Illenberger: Acoustic guitar
Helmut Grab: Mini moog
Thomas Heidepriem: Frettless bass
Anne Haigis: Vocals

Track 6: "Gigolo"
Friedemann: Electric & acoustic guitar
Matthias Thurow: Bass
Reinhold Hirth: Drums, congas and percussion

Track 7: "The Beginning Of Hope"
Helmut Grab: Mini moog
Matthias Thurow: Bass
Reinhold Hirth: Drums
Walter Kussmaul: Glass orchestra
Anne Haigis: Vocals

Track 8: "Jungle Tune"
Friedemann: Electric & acoustic guitar
Matthias Heidepriem: Violin
Helmut Grab: Mini moog
Lenny McDowell: Flute
Matthias Thurow: Bass
Reinhold Hirth: Drums

Track 9: "Hello Miss U, See You In Madrid"
Friedemann: Acoustic guitar and synthesizer
Johannes Wohlleben: Keyboards
Bubi Siebert: Handclapping
Jo Koinzer: Percussion
Capo Mayer: Bass
Reinhold Hirth: Drums
Turo: Synthesizer

Track 10: "For A Friend"
Friedemann: Acoustic guitar and synthesizer, harp, Flutes harfe and blockflöten

Track 11: "Tuning"
Friedemann: Acoustic guitar

Track 12: "He Who Walks Alone"
Friedemann: Acoustic guitar and whistle

Track 13: "After The Romance"
Friedemann: Electric & acoustic guitar and bass
Wolfgang Dauner: Piano
Helmut Grab: Mini moog

Track 14: "Atlantis"
Friedemann: Electric guitar and synthesizer
Turo: Vocoder and synthesizer

References

1995 compilation albums
Friedemann Witecka albums